Polycarpaea is a genus of plants in the family Caryophyllaceae.  The genus was named by Jean-Baptiste Lamarck in 1792. 

Molecular phylogenetic analysis showed that the genus is polyphyletic and needs to be redefined. It falls into three distinct clades. One of these, a group of species related to P. corymbosa, has acquired the  photosynthetic pathway.

Selected species
It contains the following species (but this list may be incomplete):
 Polycarpaea akkensis Maire.
 Polycarpaea aristata Chr.Sm.
 Polycarpaea balfourii Briq.
 Polycarpaea caespitosa Balf.f.
 Polycarpaea carnosa Chr.Sm.
 Polycarpaea clavifolia M.Gilbert.
 Polycarpaea corymbosa (L.) Lam.
 Polycarpaea divaricata Aiton.
 Polycarpaea filifolia Webb ex Christ.
 Polycarpaea gaudichaudii Gagnepain.
 Polycarpaea gayi Webb.
 Polycarpaea guardafuiensis M.Gilbert.
 Polycarpaea hassalensis D.F.Chamb.
 Polycarpaea hayoides D.F.Chamb.
 Polycarpaea kuriensis Wagner
 Polycarpaea latifolia Poiret.
 Polycarpaea nivea Aiton.
 Polycarpaea paulayana Wagner
 Polycarpaea pulvinata M.Gilbert.
 Polycarpaea repens (Forsskal) Ascherson & Schweinf.
 Polycarpaea robbairea (Kunze) Greuter & Burdet.
 Polycarpaea smithii Link.
 Polycarpaea somalensis Engl.
 Polycarpaea spicata Wight ex Arn.
 Polycarpaea tenuis Webb ex Christ.
 Polycarpaea ventiversa M.Gilbert.

References

 
Caryophyllaceae genera
Taxonomy articles created by Polbot